Alastair James Driver FCIEEM is an English ecologist, conservationist and rewilding specialist. He is an Honorary Professor of Applied Environmental Management at the University of Exeter and was the National Conservation Manager for the Environment Agency from 2002 to 2016. In January 2017 Driver was appointed as Director of Rewilding Britain and is at the forefront of the rewilding movement in Britain influencing national policy and advising large landowners and landowning organisations. He was described publicly in July 2020 by Environment Minister Lord Goldsmith as being “a fantastic influence on the national debate around rewilding who could take the credit for rewilding becoming more mainstream”. He is the creator and voluntary warden of Ali's Pond Local Nature Reserve in Sonning, Berks, which carries his name.

Education
Alastair Driver was born in Gloucester, England and educated at Randwick C of E Primary School and Marling School in Stroud, Glos. He studied Ecology at Lancaster University and was awarded a BSc Hons degree in 1978. Driver was appointed as an Honorary Professor in Applied Environmental Management by the University of Exeter in 2016.

Career
Driver was appointed as the first Conservation Officer for the Thames Water Authority in 1984 and oversaw the development of river and wetland conservation policies, procedures and projects in the Thames catchment through the formation of the National Rivers Authority in 1989 and the Environment Agency in 1996. During this period he initiated many partnership projects with voluntary organisations in the River Thames  catchment, including Otter Habitat Projects and Water Vole Projects with County Wildlife Trusts, aimed at the conservation and recovery of these threatened species. During this period he also oversaw the environmental aspects of many hundreds of river engineering schemes including the Jubilee River in Berkshire.

In 2002, Driver was appointed as National Conservation Manager for the Environment Agency, heading up the national team of specialists responsible for all conservation policies and procedures for this public body, until taking early retirement from public service in 2016. In the course of his regional and national roles, he founded or co-founded many initiatives, including the River Restoration Project, The River Restoration Centre  the European Riverprize, the UK Riverprize, SuDS for Schools and Catchments in Trust. In 1997 Driver set up the UK Water Vole Conservation Group which he chaired until Sept 2016. This group oversaw the delivery of the Biodiversity Action Plan for this declining species, including securing full legal protection for water voles in 2008. In recent years Driver has been a strong advocate of natural flood management and especially the acquisition of evidence on the multiple benefits of working with natural processes when managing river catchments. His ongoing compilation of this evidence, known as "Killer Facts", is published online by the Natural Environment Research Council.

Driver was appointed as Director of Rewilding Britain in Jan 2017, advising major landowners (public and private) on rewilding and influencing national government on policies and funding mechanisms to incentivise rewilding. Recent evidence of this influence are the inclusion of natural regeneration in the England Woodland Creation Offer and the Defra commitment to include rewilding in the Landscape Recovery component of the Environmental Land Management scheme.

Recognition and honours
 Awarded the role of Ambassador for the International Riverfoundation - 2008 
 Recipient of the $350,000 International Riverprize on behalf of the River Thames - 2010
 Admitted as a Fellow of the Chartered Institute of Ecology and Environmental Management (CIEEM) - 2012
 Included in Who's Who (UK) for "influence and distinction" in the field of environmental conservation - 2013 
 Recipient of the CIEEM Small Conservation Projects Award, on behalf of the Friends of Ali's Pond - 2016
 Awarded Honorary Professor status by University of Exeter - 2016

Voluntary roles
International:
 Ambassador, International Riverfoundation, 2008–present
 Judge, European Riverprize, 2013–2016
 Specialist Adviser, Flow Partnership, 2016–present
National:
 Trustee and Council Member, 2000-2002 Royal Society of Wildlife Trusts
 Trustee and Council Member, 2010–2020 Wildfowl and Wetlands Trust
 Natural Environment Advisory Panel Member, 2010-2016 National Trust
 Volunteer Specialist, 2016–present National Trust
 Specialist Adviser, Wild Trout Trust, 2016–present
Local:
 Voluntary Warden, 1997–present Ali's Pond LNR
 Specialist Adviser, Knepp Rewilding Group, 2016–present
 Specialist Adviser, River Otter Beaver Trial, 2016–present
 Exec Committee Member, Sonning and Sonning Eye Society, 2016–present
 Regular (monthly) guest expert on BBC Radio Berkshire "Talk on the Wildside" 2017–present
 Natural England Landscape Advisory Panel Member Natural England  2021–present

Expedition experience
 Expedition team member – Western Australian coast and Pilbara region – 1996.
 Expedition team member and wildlife studies lead for Scientific Exploration Society – Colombian Amazonas – May 2017
 Expedition team member and wildlife studies lead for Scientific Exploration Society Bardia National Park, SW Nepal – March 2019.

In addition to the above he has advised on environmental issues around the world including:
 Expert Advisor to the Russian authorities on the establishment and management of the Meshchyora National Park – Russia’s first wetland national park – in 1992.
 Government training tutor on environmental legislation and priorities for the Commonwealth Secretariat in the Pacific and Asian regions (2006)
 Senior expert on stakeholder engagement for the EU-China partnership, China (2011)
 Adviser on ecotourism and sustainable management to the 3rd Crown Princess of Perak, Malaysia (2012)
 Adviser on ecotourism and sustainable management for Grasshopper (environmental NGO), Kaziranga National Park, India (2013)

Personal
Alastair Driver was born on 9th Oct 1956. He has been married to Belinda since 1980 and they have three sons, Daniel, Liam and Kieran. He has lived in Sonning, Berkshire since 1987.

References 

English ecologists
English conservationists
Rewilding advocates
Year of birth missing (living people)
Living people